Katrampakkam is a village in Vanur taluk, Viluppuram district, Tamil Nadu, India. It is a small village which had a population of approximately 1,300 people in 2008.

Economy
The primary economic activity in the village is agriculture. In the past, the majority of the population worked for a small group of landlords but now more people are going to school and obtaining higher degrees. The majority of the people currently work in nearby towns and cities such as Pondicherry, Tindivanam, Chennai, and even as far away as Bangalore.

Transport
It is situated on National Highway 66 of 15 km from Pondicherry to Krishnagiri highway. Katrampakkam connects the East Coast Road(ECR) by 11 km of East to Bay of Bengal.

Education
There is a government school in Katrampakkam. A feature of the school is that it serves a free lunch which includes eggs for all its students in accordance with Tamil Nadu Department of Education regulations. Currently, students are taught Tamil up to "X standard" after which students progress to higher levels of schooling in nearby villages.

Villages in Viluppuram district